The Register of Historic Parks and Gardens of Special Historic Interest in England, created in 1983, is administered by Historic England.  It includes more than 1,600 sites, ranging from gardens of private houses, to cemeteries and public parks.

There are 149 registered parks and gardens in the East Midlands. 16 are listed at grade I, the highest grade, 40 at grade II*, the middle grade, and 93 at grade II, the lowest grade.

Key

Parks and gardens

Derbyshire

Leicestershire

Lincolnshire

Northamptonshire

Nottinghamshire

Rutland

References

Notes

Listed parks and gardens in England
East Midlands